Reason and Morality is a 1978 book about ethics by the philosopher Alan Gewirth. The work for which he is best known, it received positive reviews. The work is defended by the legal scholar Deryck Beyleveld in The Dialectical Necessity of Morality (1991).

Summary

Gewirth discusses the rational justification of moral principles.

Publication history
Reason and Morality was first published in 1978 by the University of Chicago Press.

Reception
Reason and Morality received positive reviews from Robert Hoffman in Library Journal, E. M. Adams in The Review of Metaphysics, and the philosopher Loren Lomasky in The Philosophical Quarterly. The book was also discussed by Richard Brooks in the Journal of Legal Education, the philosopher Marcus George Singer in Ratio Juris, Ari Kohen in Human Rights Review, Eric Reitan in Social Theory and Practice,  Brian K. Powell in Dialogue: Canadian Philosophical Review, Rutger Claassen and Marcus Düwell in Ethical Theory and Moral Practice, and Anna-Karin Margareta Andersson in the Journal of Medical Ethics. In Choice, the book was discussed by H. Oberdiek and J. M. Betz.

Hoffman described the book as "ambitious and careful" and "eminently worth reading." Adams described the book as a major work in the ongoing enterprise by modern philosophers to "solve the problem of morality from within the epistemological assumptions that define the dominant cultural perspective of our age." He considered its publication "a major event in the history of moral philosophy." He credited Gewirth with developing his arguments in favor of "modified naturalism" patiently and carefully, and with providing "rich detail and abundance of insights". Nevertheless, he criticized the details of some of Gewirth's arguments, questioning whether some of Gewirth's value judgments supported his conclusions, and suggested that Gewirth's conception of morality is too narrow.

Lomasky found some of Gewirth's arguments to be flawed, believed that Gewirth failed to establish the "rationally necessary supreme substantive principle" of morality, and noted that it "has been suggested that the universalisation extending the proscription against interference as a normative rule incumbent upon all agents is invalid." He also questioned "the concept of having a right to non-interference", arguing that it was doubtful that the fact that people want freedom and well-being logically supported the claim that people have rights to these things. However, he agreed with Gewirth's view that the purposive and voluntary nature of action shows that it has a "normative structure", and believed that a view of morality similar to Gewirth's might be defensible. He concluded that Reason and Morality was "an essential resource for all subsequent explorations" of the issues it discussed.

Brooks credited Gewirth with providing "a complex and detailed brief for an individualist, humanist, ethical position" and presenting "a logical linkage between the system and legal decision making relevant to law students." Singer wrote that the book was "justly famous" and a "masterful treatise", and that it was praised by the philosopher Henry Babcock Veatch. According to Singer, the book became the focus of an "immense volume of commentary", with Gewirth's idea of prudential rights being especially controversial, having received criticism from Singer himself, as well as other authors. He noted that Gewirth had responded to the commentary on his work and that Deryck Beyleveld, in The Dialectical Necessity of Morality (1991), discussed criticisms of it and defended Gewirth's views, though in his opinion Beyleveld was not successful in defending Gewirth's view of prudential rights. He argued that while Reason and Morality was original and brilliant, Gewirth's outlook excluded the possibility of reasonable disagreement about moral issues.

Kohen wrote that Gewirth's ideas had received nearly as much attention as those advanced by the philosopher John Rawls in A Theory of Justice (1971). He noted that Gewirth, assisted by Beyleveld, had responded to many of his critics, but argued that Gewirth failed to provide an adequate "secular foundation for the idea of human rights." He criticized Gewirth's view "that self-contradiction represents the most compelling argument against violating human rights". He also argued that "an agent might accept the first part of Gewirth’s theory about his own generic rights and reject without
contradiction the second part about universalizing those rights" and that "Gewirth’s prospective purposive agents are too far removed from the real world in which human rights are actually in play." He drew on the ideas of the psychoanalyst Jacques Lacan to criticize Gewirth's work. Powell suggested that there was a "decisive objection" to Gewirth's views, which he compared to those of the philosophers Jürgen Habermas and Karl-Otto Apel. Claassen and Düwell compared Gewirth's views to those of the philosopher Martha Nussbaum. They noted that Gewirth's approach to morality "has been widely discussed with regard to its basic assumptions and the strengths and weaknesses of its justification" and that it has been "applied to discourses about human rights, political philosophy, economy, and bioethics".

Andersson explored the relevance of Gewirth's arguments to the issue of abortion.

The philosopher Jan Narveson stated that Reason and Morality is an important work. However, he considered Gewirth's moral theory open to criticism. Narveson argued that while, according to Gewirth, rational agents must acknowledge a certain set of rights because those rights are required for their "purpose-fulfilling actions", such actions do not require rights but only "enough noninterference by others". He also rejected Gewirth's view that rational agents must acknowledge these rights for all in order to claim them for themselves, arguing that, in a person's capacity as a rational agent, they want only noninterference from others, and that this does not logically require them to accept "the duties entailed by wholehearted acceptance" of the rights Gewirth sees as following from people's need to engage in "purpose-fulfilling actions".

The philosopher James P. Sterba stated that Reason and Morality is the work for which Gewirth is best known.

References

Bibliography
Books

 
 
 

Journals

 
 
  
  
  
  
  
  
  
  
  
  

1978 non-fiction books
American non-fiction books
Books by Alan Gewirth
Contemporary philosophical literature
English-language books
Ethics books
University of Chicago Press books